Salvino Azzopardi (21 June 1931 – 6 August 2006), was a Maltese Jesuit priest, philosopher at Jnana Deepa, Institute of Philosophy and Theology in Pune, India. He specialised in logic, epistemology, ethics, metaphysics, mysticism, and metaphilosophy. As a philosopher he combined insights from Indian and Western Philosophies. Besides JDV, Pune, India, he has also taught at the Jesuit Philosophate, Kandy, Sri Lanka and Diocesan Seminary, Gozo, Malta.

He is famous for his new insights on mysticism and metaphilosophy. His ideas and insights have influenced many philosophers in India.

Early childhood
Salvino, the fifth child of the Legal Procurator Philip Azzopardi and Giuseppina née Borg, and nephew of the servant of God, Eugenio Borg, his mother’s brother, was born on 20 June 1931 at Hamrun, Malta. He had his secondary schooling at the Lyceum and at an early age joined the “Lega”, the Hamrun Catholic Action “Milites Christi Regis”, where he became a catechist of the young aspirants.

Early Jesuit life
In 1947, at the age of sixteen, Salvino joined the Society of Jesus at Naxxar, Malta, following in the footsteps of his elder brother Anton who had joined the Society two years ahead of him. He emitted his first vows in 1949 at Naxxar, and then followed the normal course of studies in the Society: two years literature at Naxxar, three years philosophy at Vals in France, a year’s prefecting the boys at St Aloysius’ College, Malta, and another year at Clongows College, Ireland. Then four years of theology at Heythrop College, Oxon, England, where he was ordained priest on 31 July 1959. Fr Salvino did his Third Year of Novitiate in Florence, Italy, after which, i.e. in 1961, he was sent to the Gregorian University in Rome where in 1963 he took his Doctorate in Philosophy “cum laude”.

Back to Malta and more
After all those years of intensive intellectual activity in India, Fr Salvino began to feel his health wane. So in 1990 his Superiors advised him to return to Malta to regain his health. The doctors in Malta sent him to London for a heart
by-pass surgery, after which he had to spend over a year convalescing in Malta. Fr Salvino aspired to go back to India, but could not.

Death
From 2001 onwards, Fr Salvino stayed at Loyola House, Naxxar, Malta, and carried on with his studies in Sanskrit, Greek and Hebrew. He was also the House historian and put in charge of various small offices. When his health did not permit him to move about freely he stayed in bed and spent time in prayer, listening to classical music and watching DVD films on his computer.
His health grew worse. In 2006 the periodic but frequent severe bouts of stomach and pulmonary attacks made his life miserable. But he never lost his optimism, his cheerful smile and his hearty laugh, nor did he ever refuse to help anyone who asked for his assistance.

On 6 August 2006, the feast of Our Lord the Saviour, his namesake, Fr Salvino, feeling relatively well, accepted an invitation by his niece to lunch at her house. At about 3:00 p.m. he started feeling queer in his chest and hard to breathe. He was rushed back home, and the doctor ordered him straight to hospital. Fr Salvino, in bitter pain and hardly able to breathe, received the last rites and just after at 9:00p.m. he passed away.

Biography
Azzopardi left Malta for Pune, India as a missionary in 1964.
He belonged to the Maltese Province of the Society of Jesus and was lent to Dumka-Raiganj Province (formerly Santal Region) of the Society of Jesus, Jharkhand, India.

In India, he was primarily involved in teaching philosophy at Jnana Deepa, Institute of Philosophy and Theology, Pune. Then in  1988, due to ill health, he returned to Malta. Later for a brief period of time, he went to Sri Lanka to start the Jesuit philosophate there. He was recalled to be made the rector of Gozzo Seminary. He died in 2006, at Naxxar, Malta.

Writings
Epistemology and Phenomenology of Religions: Creative Insights into Intercultural and Interreligous Dialogue. Kuruvilla Pandikattu (ed.) Christian World Imprints, New Delhi, 2018.https://www.christianworldimprints.com/index.php?p=sr&Uc=4497051135954115440
The Controversy about Christian Philosophy (1931-196 3)
The Controversy about "Christian Philosophy" (1931-1963): A Historico-critical Study/ Pontificia Universitas Gregoriana, Rome, 1994.https://books.google.at/books/about/The_Controversy_about_Christian_Philosop.html?id=DP0PzgEACAAJ&redir_esc=y
Ethics (Mimeographed Notes) Jnana Deepa, Institute of Philosophy and Theology, Pune, 1985.
Logic (Mimeographed Notes) Jnana Deepa, Institute of Philosophy and Theology, Pune, 1984.
Epistemology  (Mimeographed Notes) Jnana Deepa, Institute of Philosophy and Theology, Pune, 1983.
Metaphilosophy (Mimeographed Notes) Jnana Deepa, Institute of Philosophy and Theology, Pune, 1983.
Theism and the Problem of Evil. Cyclostyled notes for students. Jnana Deepa, Institute of Philosophy and Theology, Pune, 1981.
Phenomenology of Religion. Cyclostyled notes for students. Jnana Deepa, Institute of Philosophy and Theology, Pune, 1981.
Philosophy of Religion. Cyclostyled notes for students. Jnana Deepa, Institute of Philosophy and Theology, Pune, 1980.
Mysticism. Cyclostyled notes for students. Jnana Deepa, Institute of Philosophy and Theology, Pune, 1980.
Thomas Aquinas. Cyclostyled notes for students. Jnana Deepa, Institute of Philosophy and Theology, Pune, 1980.

References

External links
Maltese Jesuits
Jnana Deepa, Institute of Philosophy and Theology, Pune, India
Indian Jesuits

1931 births
2006 deaths
20th-century Indian philosophers
20th-century Maltese philosophers
20th-century Indian Jesuits
21st-century Indian philosophers
21st-century Maltese philosophers
20th-century Maltese Roman Catholic priests
English-language writers from Malta
English-language writers from India
Epistemologists
Metaphysicians
Maltese Jesuits
Maltese logicians
Maltese ethicists
Indian logicians
Indian ethicists